Ravensrodd, also spelt Ravenser Odd, was a constituency of the House of Commons of the Parliament of England, first represented in the Model Parliament of 1295. It was represented by two Members of Parliament intermittently until 1337.

The constituency was a Parliamentary borough in the East Riding of Yorkshire, consisting of the port of Ravensrodd at the mouth of the Humber estuary. The sandbanks on which the town was built shifted in the 14th century, and it was entirely swept away. The site is now underwater.

See also
 List of former United Kingdom Parliament constituencies

References
Constituencies of the Parliament of the United Kingdom established in 1295
1337 disestablishments
Parliamentary constituencies of the East Riding of Yorkshire (defunct)
1295 establishments in England
Submerged places